Mahbubul Huq was a Member of the 3rd National Assembly of Pakistan as a representative of East Pakistan.

Career
Huq was a Member of the  3rd National Assembly of Pakistan representing Comilla-cum-Noakhali. He was a member of an Inquiry Commission led by Abdul Jabbar Khan to investigate Muslims evicted from Tripura and Assam and forced into East Pakistan.

Huq was born at Farhadnagar, Feni. He was one of the forgotten heroes who actively fought for the freedom of the then East Pakistan people. His leadership traits earned him the title "Black Terror of Bengal" during Ayub regime.

1945: Huq joined the Trade Union (Asaam Bengal Railway) movement with Mr. Jyoti Basu in Asaam (Lamding) at the age of 22. 1948: He became the General Secretary of EPREL with Sher-E-Bangla AK Fazlul Haq's running mate 1952: Honored by Industrial Tribunal formed by the Governmentt of Pakistan to represent EPREL (though he was not a lawyer) in place of Barrister Hamidul Haq Chowdhury. EPREL won the tribunal case. Actively participated in the Rashtro Bhasha Andolon (Language Movement) through EPREL, Weekly Sainik and Tamuddin Majlish. Labour leader Mahbubul Huq's contribution to establish Bangla as the National Language of Bangladesh has been written in history as well. https://www.tbsnews.net/bangladesh/unsung-language-movement-heroes-chattogram-373924. 1954: Nominated from the "Haq-Bhashani" Jukto Front for the then Provincial Assembly of East Pakistan 1956: Started publishing the Weekly Pallibarta from Feni as Editor. Mr. Belal Chowdhury was acting Editor 1958: Joined Daily Pakistan Observer as Commercial Manager and was promoted to Managing Editor in 1967 1964: Bangabondhu Sheikh Mujibur Rahman received Huq after returning from West Pakistan at Dhaka Airport for pro-people activism in the then Pakistan parliament. 1965: Bangabondhu Sheikh Mujibur Rahman sponsored Huq for nomination as COP candidate for National Assembly of Pakistan 1967: Got elected unopposed President of EPREL and continued till 1971. 1969: Started Daily Purbodesh from Observer House, Dhaka. He was the founder editor of Purbadesh, naming the newspaper indicating a pseudo-name for a separate country 'Bangladesh' 1974: Joined Daily Janapad as advisor and continued till he died on 5 June 1974.

Despite his not being a trained lawyer, he defeated Hamoodur Rahman, Bar at Law, in 1952 in the Industrial Tribunal (Railway) case. He ran the Observer Group efficiently without even being a journalist by training. Huq was a leader by example, a journalist par excellence, and a trade unionist by heart.

References

 

https://thedailynewnation.com/news/51438/The-historic-Language-Movement

Pakistani MNAs 1962–1965
Living people
Year of birth missing (living people)